Garance Marillier (born 11 February 1998) is a French actress. She is known for her lead role in Raw released in 2016.

Early life
Prior to becoming an actress she learned the trombone and classical percussion at the Conservatoire of the 11th arrondissement, Paris. In 2009 she started theater at the Dyonis company, then joined the Cours Florent in 2010 and the Ecole du Jeu in 2012.

Career
Marillier began her acting career in 2011 by playing Justine in the short movie Junior by Julia Ducournau. The film was selected for viewing at the Critics Week at the Cannes festival. The next year Garance appeared in the short movie It’s Not a Cowboy Film in 2012 which was again selected to be screened at Cannes. She continued to star in short movies every year until she landed the lead role of Justine in Raw in 2016 starring alongside Ella Rumpf, her second collaboration with director Julia Ducournau.

Filmography

References

External links

1998 births
Living people
Actresses from Paris
French film actresses
French television actresses
21st-century French actresses